The Scottish Gaelic Awards (  to people who have made significant contributions to the Gaelic language. They are organised by Bòrd na Gàidhlig in partnership with Media Scotland (primarily the Daily Record) and also sponsored by Education Scotland and Highlands and Islands Enterprise with support from the Western Isles Council.

Award winners

2016

2015

2014
In 2014 the former Workplace Initiative Award was replaced by the Gaelic as an Economic Asset category.

2013

See also
Sàr Ghaidheal Fellowships

References

Scottish awards
Scottish Gaelic language